Gamasellevans is a genus of mites in the family Ologamasidae. There are about seven described species in Gamasellevans.

Species
These seven species belong to the genus Gamasellevans:
 Gamasellevans bispermadactylus Loots & Ryke, 1967
 Gamasellevans epigynialis Loots & Ryke, 1967
 Gamasellevans evansi Loots & Ryke, 1967
 Gamasellevans magoebaensis Loots & Ryke, 1967
 Gamasellevans reticulatus Loots & Ryke, 1967
 Gamasellevans spermadactylus Loots & Ryke, 1967
 Gamasellevans vandenbergi Loots & Ryke, 1967

References

Ologamasidae